Machino is a rural locality (a village) in Beryozovskoye Rural Settlement, Beryozovsky District, Perm Krai, Russia. The population was 88 as of 2010. There are 3 streets.

Geography 
It is located 2.5 km east from Beryozovka.

References 

Rural localities in Beryozovsky District, Perm Krai